A galactic halo is an extended, roughly spherical component of a galaxy which extends beyond the main, visible component. Several distinct components of galaxies comprise the halo:

 the stellar halo
 the galactic corona (hot gas, i.e. a plasma)
 the dark matter halo

The distinction between the halo and the main body of the galaxy is clearest in spiral galaxies, where the spherical shape of the halo contrasts with the flat disc. In an elliptical galaxy, there is no sharp transition between the other components of the galaxy and the halo.

A halo can be studied by observing its effect  on the passage of light from distant bright objects like quasars that are in line of sight beyond the galaxy in question.

Components of the galactic halo

Stellar halo 
The stellar halo is a nearly spherical population of field stars and globular clusters. It surrounds most disk galaxies as well as some elliptical galaxies of type cD. A low amount (about one percent) of a galaxy's stellar mass resides in the stellar halo, meaning its luminosity is much lower than other components of the galaxy.

The Milky Way's stellar halo contains globular clusters, RR Lyrae stars with low metal content, and subdwarfs. Stars in our stellar halo tend to be old (most are greater than 12 billion years old) and metal-poor, but there are also halo star clusters with observed metal content similar to disk stars. The halo stars of the Milky Way have an observed radial velocity dispersion of about 200 km/s and a low average velocity of rotation of about 50 km/s. Star formation in the stellar halo of the Milky Way ceased long ago.

Galactic corona 
A galactic corona is a distribution of gas extending far away from the center of the galaxy. It can be detected by the distinct emission spectrum it gives off, showing the presence of HI gas (H one, 21 cm microwave line) and other features detectable by X-ray spectroscopy.

Dark matter halo 
The dark matter halo is a theorized distribution of dark matter which extends throughout the galaxy extending far beyond its visible components. The mass of the dark matter halo is far greater than the mass of the other components of the galaxy. Its existence is hypothesized in order to account for the gravitational potential that determines the dynamics of bodies within galaxies. The nature of dark matter halos is an important area in current research in cosmology, in particular its relation to galactic formation and evolution.

The Navarro–Frenk–White profile is a widely accepted density profile of the dark matter halo determined through numerical simulations.

The invisible halo component cannot extend with this density profile indefinitely, however; this would lead to a diverging integral when calculating mass. It does, however, provide a finite gravitational potential for all . Most measurements that can be made are relatively insensitive to the outer halo's mass distribution. The only dynamical variable related to the extent of the halo that can be constrained is the escape velocity: the fastest-moving stellar objects still gravitationally bound to the Galaxy can give a lower bound on the mass profile of the outer edges of the dark halo.

Formation of galactic halos 
The formation of stellar halos occurs naturally in a cold dark matter model of the universe in which the evolution of systems such as halos occurs from the bottom-up, meaning the large scale structure of galaxies is formed starting with small objects. Halos, which are composed of both baryonic and dark matter, form by merging with each other. Evidence suggests that the formation of galactic halos may also be due to the effects of increased gravity and the presence of primordial black holes. The gas from halo mergers goes toward the formation of the central galactic components, while stars and dark matter remain in the galactic halo.

On the other hand, the halo of the Milky Way Galaxy is thought to derive from the Gaia Sausage.

See also

References

External links 

Galaxies